Sharee Ann Tee Tan-Delos Santos (born May 11, 1982) is a Filipino politician from the province of Samar. She currently serves as Governor of Samar since June 30, 2022, a position she formerly held from 2010 to 2019.

Early life
Tan was born on May 11, 1982 to Ricardo Tan and Milagrosa Tee. She is a sister to Angelie Tan, Stephen James Tan and Reynolds Michael Tan.

She earned a pharmacy degree at University of San Carlos in Cebu City.

Political career
Tan first served as representative of Samar's 2nd district from 2007 to 2010. At 25 years old, she was the youngest member of the House of Representatives during the 14th Congress and holds the title until present.

In 2010, Tan ran and won as governor of Samar, to which she held on to her seat in the 2013 and 2016 elections.

In 2019, Tan ran and reclaimed her post as Samar's 2nd district representative.  

In the 2022 local elections, she ran, won, and reclaimed her post as governor of Samar, switching places with her brother Reynolds Michael Tan.

Personal life
She is married to businessman Richard de los Santos, and have three children together.

References

|-

|-

Living people

1982 births
Governors of Samar (province)
Politicians from Samar (province)
PDP–Laban politicians
Lakas–CMD politicians
National Unity Party (Philippines) politicians